Ruth Ellen Kinna (born March 1961) is a professor of political philosophy at Loughborough University, working in the Department of Politics, History and International Relations. Since 2007 she has been the editor of the journal Anarchist Studies.

Kinna holds a BA in history and politics from Queen Mary University of London and a D.Phil in politics from the University of Oxford. She began working at Loughborough University in 1992. Her subsequent work focused on the socialist thought of William Morris (1834–1896). She is the author of the book Anarchism - A Beginners Guide, an in depth study into the political concept of anarchy.

References 

Alumni of the University of London
Alumni of the University of Oxford
Academics of Loughborough University
Living people
1961 births
British political philosophers
British anarchists